Kösereli  is a village in Erdemli district of Mersin Province, Turkey. At   it is situated in the Toros Mountains. The population of the village was 125  as of 2012. The ancestors of the village people were the members of Kufralı Turkmen tribe which was formerly settled in Aşağıköselerli and Yukarıköselerli villages in Mut district of Mersin Province. In 1790 some members of the tribe migrated to settle in the present location as a hamlet of Güzelyurt village. In 1954 they gained the legal status of village.
Main economic activity of the village is ovine breeding.

References

Villages in Erdemli District